The Chief Advisor is the head of an interim government of Bhutan following a dissolution of assembly, in preparation for National Assembly elections.

Chief advisors

References

Political office-holders in Bhutan
Caretaker governments